The House of Ulhôa Cintra, also known as the House of Minister is a historic residence in Caçapava do Sul, Rio Grande do Sul, Brazil. It was built in the middle of the 19th century and was a meeting place of figures associated with the Ragamuffin War; it notably housed the printing press of their newspaper, O Povo. It was subsequently owned by José Pinheiro de Ulhôa Cintra and his family. Casa de Ulhôa Cintra was listed as a historic structure by the Historic and Artistic Heritage Institute of Rio Grande do Sul in 1994.

Location

The House of Ulhôa Cintra is located on the corner of Rua 7 de Setembro and Rua Borges de Medeiros. It is one of many historic structures that surround the broad public plaza surrounded the Parish Church of Our Lady of the Assumption.

History

The House of Ulhôa Cintra is associated with the Ragamuffin War, a Republican uprising in Rio Grande do Sul. The conflict began in 1835 and only ended in 1845. The mansion once housed the typographic works of O Povo, the official newspaper of the Ragamuffin revolution. 116 of the 160 issues of the newspaper were printed at the house. The Farroupilhas, supporters of the Ragamuffin War, called the house the Casa de Reunião, or meeting house. The house became the residence of Ulhôa Cintra and his family after the end of the Ragamuffin War. It was later used to exhibit films and house a small museum, but its successive owners made few alterations to the house, and it retains many of its original details.

Structure

The House of Ulhôa Cintra is a single-story house built in the late Portuguese colonial style; it is typical of other houses built in the first half of the 19th century in Brazil. It has a tiled hipped roof with eaves and a simple cymatium. The house sits above, but in close alignment to the street. It has two doors, each accessed by steps. There are four sash windows at the front of the building, and two to the side. All have internal shutters of wood. An ornate relief, probably the coat-of-arms of the Cintra family, is above window level in the middle of the north façade.

Casa de Ulhôa Cintra is in advanced state of disrepair, and is unused due to a partial roof collapse.

Protected status

Casa de Ulhôa Cintra was listed as a historic structure by the Historic and Artistic Heritage Institute of Rio Grande do Sul (IPHAE) in 1994.

Access

Casa de Ulhôa Cintra is not open to the public and may not be visited.

References

Buildings and structures in Rio Grande do Sul
Portuguese colonial architecture in Brazil
Houses in Brazil